Thirumayilai metro station is a Metro railway station on the Orange Line of the Chennai Metro. The station is among the underground stations along corridor I of the Chennai Metro, Lighthouse–Poonamallee Bypass stretch. The station serves the neighbourhoods of Mylapore.

History

Construction

Station layout

The station
The first (uppermost) level will be at a depth of  consisting of the Madhavaram–SIPCOT upper track. The third (lowermost) level will be at a depth of  consisting of the Madhavaram–SIPCOT lower track.

See also

 List of Chennai metro stations
 Railway stations in Chennai
 Chennai Mass Rapid Transit System
 Chennai Monorail
 Chennai Suburban Railway
 Transport in Chennai

References

External links

 
 UrbanRail.Net – descriptions of all metro systems in the world, each with a schematic map showing all stations.

Chennai Metro stations
Railway stations in Chennai